Robert Joseph "Bob" Swenning (July 25, 1924 – November 8, 2012) was an American figure skater.  He was born in Greenwich, Connecticut.  He originally competed in ice dance, winning the gold medal at the 1945 United States Figure Skating Championships with partner Kathe Mehl Williams.  He later switched to pairs skating and teamed up with Yvonne Sherman.  The duo won the 1947 U.S. title, placed fourth at the 1948 Winter Olympic Games, and finished fifth at that year's World Figure Skating Championship.  He later paired with Agnes Tyson and won the bronze medal at the 1955 U.S. Championships.

Pairs

(with Sherman)

(with Tyson)

Ice Dance
(with Williams)

References

Robert Swenning's obituary

1924 births
2012 deaths
American male ice dancers
American male pair skaters
Olympic figure skaters of the United States
Figure skaters at the 1948 Winter Olympics
20th-century American people